Private Benjamin is an American sitcom television series based on and set during the events of the 1980 movie of the same name that aired on CBS from April 6, 1981, to January 10, 1983. Eileen Brennan, who reprised her role from the film, won an Primetime Emmy Award and Golden Globe Award for her work on the series.

Synopsis
Like the movie, the series is about a spoiled young socialite named Judy Benjamin adjusting to life in the army. She's popular among her fellow enlisted personnel (with the exception of Pvt. Carol Winter), but not with her superiors. Most of the humor in the series is derived from Benjamin and her friends' attempts to evade the watchful eye of their captain. 

Although some of the actors from the film play the same characters on the TV show, (notably Eileen Brennan and Hal Williams, in their roles of Captain Doreen Lewis and Sgt. L.C. Ross respectively) the title role is acted by Lorna Patterson instead of Goldie Hawn.

While the series was initially shot on film and featured many outdoor scenes, later episodes were more like a standard sitcom, shot on video on soundstages and complete with a laugh track.

In the fall of 1982, Robert Mandan joined the cast as Colonel Lawrence Fielding, the pompous, well-meaning, but ineffectual, head of the camp.  In late 1982, Eileen Brennan was struck by a car and Polly Holliday was brought in as Captain Amanda Allen, intended as a temporary replacement for Brennan's Captain Lewis character, but the show was cancelled shortly thereafter.

Cast and characters
Lorna Patterson as Pvt. Judith "Judy" Benjamin
Eileen Brennan as Cpt. Doreen Lewis
Joyce Little as Pvt. Rayleen White
Robert Mandan as Col. Lawrence Fielding
Ann Ryerson as Pvt. Carol Winter
Wendie Jo Sperber as Pvt. Stacy Kouchalakas
Lucy Webb as Pvt. Luanne Hubble
Hal Williams as Sgt. Ted Ross
Lisa Raggio as Pvt. Maria Gianelli
Damita Jo Freeman as Pvt. Jackie Sims
Polly Holliday as Cpt. Amanda Allen

Episodes

Awards and nominations

References

External links

1981 American television series debuts
1983 American television series endings
1980s American sitcoms
CBS original programming
English-language television shows
Military comedy television series
Live action television shows based on films
Television series by Warner Bros. Television Studios
Television shows set in Kentucky